Sir Herbet Gibson, 1st Baronet  (8 July 1863 – 28 December 1934) was a British-Argentinian landowner and agriculturist in Argentina.

Biography
Gibson was born at Bridge of Allan, Stirlingshire, and educated at the Norfolk County School. He became a landowner and live-stock breeder in Argentina, where his family had owned property since 1819. He took active part in public affairs in Argentina. He became an Argentinian citizen in 1888, allowing him to serve as mayor of the town of Ajó (also known as General Lavalle). He was chairman of the British Chamber of Commerce in Argentina and vice-president of the  Argentine Rural Society, a landowners' organization. He resumed British citizenship in 1915 and was Wheat Commissioner in Argentina and Uruguay for a Royal Commission on Wheat Supplies, set up in 1916 during the First World War to manage the purchase and distribution of grain supplies for Great Britain and the Allies.

For his service as Wheat Commissioner, Gibson was knighted in the 1919 New Year Honours. He was created a Baronet of the United Kingdom in the 1931 Birthday Honours "for services in connection with the British Empire Trade Exhibition at Buenos Aires." He became "Sir Herbert Gibson of Linconia [La Linconia, his estate in Argentina] and of Faccombe in the County of Southampton".

References

GIBSON, Sir Herbert, Who Was Who, A & C Black, 1920–2016 (online edition, Oxford University Press, 2015)

1863 births
1934 deaths
Scottish agriculturalists
British expatriates in Argentina
Knights Commander of the Order of the British Empire
Baronets in the Baronetage of the United Kingdom
Burials at La Chacarita Cemetery